India's medical schools are usually called medical colleges. Medical school quality is controlled by the central regulatory authority, the National Medical Commission, which inspects the institutes from time to time and recognizes institutes for specific courses. Most of the medical schools were set up by the central and state governments in the 1950s and 60s. But in the 1980s, several private medical institutes were founded in several states, particularly in Karnataka. Andhra Pradesh state allowed the founding of several private institutions in the new millennium. Medical education in a private institute can be expensive if not subsidized by the government.

The basic medical qualification obtained in Indian medical schools is MBBS. The MBBS course is four-and-a-half years, followed by one year of Compulsory Rotating Residential Internship (CRRI). The MBBS course is followed by MS, a post-graduation course in surgical specialties, or MD, a post-graduation course in medical specialities or DNB in any medical or surgical specialities, which are usually of three years duration, or diploma postgraduate courses of two years duration. Super or sub-specialties can be pursued and only a MS or MD holder is eligible. A qualification in a super- or sub-specialty is called DM or MCh.

As of 2021, entry to medical education is based on the rank obtained in NEET (UG). Some institutes like the All India Institutes of Medical Sciences, Christian Medical College, Kasturba Medical College, Jawaharlal Institute of Postgraduate Medical Education and Research, Armed Forces Medical College, St. John's Medical College and National Institute of Mental Health and Neurosciences used to conduct separate entrance tests at the national level before NEET.

Indian states with the most medical colleges include Karnataka, Maharashtra, Tamil Nadu, and Uttar Pradesh. States with the fewest include Manipur, Tripura, Chandigarh, Goa, and Sikkim.

, there are 543 medical colleges and 64 stand alone PG Institutes in India whose qualifications are recognized by the National Medical Commission. Following is an incomplete list of medical colleges in India.

Andaman and Nicobar Islands

Andhra Pradesh

Arunachal Pradesh

Assam

Bihar

Chandigarh

Chhattisgarh

Delhi

Goa

Gujarat

Haryana

Himachal Pradesh

Jammu & Kashmir

Jharkhand

Karnataka
A J Institute of Medical Science, Mangalore
Bangalore Medical College and Research Institute, Bangalore
Bidar Institute of Medical Sciences, Bidar
ESIC Medical College, Gulbarga
Father Muller Medical College, Mangalore
Gulbarga Institute of Medical Sciences, Gulbarga
Jawaharlal Nehru Medical College, Belgaum
JSS medical college, Mysore
Karnataka Institute of Medical Sciences, Hubli
Kasturba Medical College, Mangalore
Kasturba Medical College, Manipal
Kempegowda Institute of Medical Sciences, Bangalore
Khaja Banda Nawaz Institute of Medical Sciences, Gulbarga
Koppal Institute of Medical Sciences, Koppal
KS Hegde Medical Academy Mangalore
Mysore Medical College
Mahadevappa Rampure Medical College, Gulbarga.
Mandya Institute of Medical Sciences, Mandya
National Institute of Mental Health and Neurosciences, Bangalore
Navodaya Medical College, Raichur
Rajarajeswari Medical College and Hospital, Bangalore
S Nijalingappa Medical College, HSK (Hanagal Shree Kumareshwar) Hospital and Research Centre
S. S. Institute of Medical Sciences, Davangere
Sri Devaraj Urs Medical College, Kolar
Shimoga Institute of Medical Sciences, Shimoga
St John's Medical College, Bangalore
Vijayanagara Institute of Medical Sciences
Vydehi Institute of Medical Sciences and Research Centre

Kerala

Madhya Pradesh

Maharashtra

Manipur

Meghalaya

Mizoram

Nagaland

Odisha

Puducherry

Punjab

Rajasthan

Sikkim

Tamil Nadu
Chengalpattu Medical College, Chengalpattu
Christian Medical College, Vellore
Coimbatore Medical College, Coimbatore
Government Dharmapuri Medical College, Dharmapuri
Government Sivagangai Medical College and Hospital, Sivagangai
Government Tiruvannamalai Medical College and Hospital, Tiruvannamalai
Government Vellore Medical College, Vellore
Government Villupuram Medical College, Villupuram
IRT Perundurai Medical College. Perundurai, Erode
K.A.P. Viswanatham Government Medical College, Trichy, Tamil Nadu
Kanyakumari Government Medical College, Kanyakumari
Kilpauk Medical College, Chetput
Madras Medical College, Chennai
Madurai Medical College, Madurai
Mohan Kumaramangalam Medical College, Salem, Tamil Nadu
Rajah Muthiah Medical College, Chidambaram
Sri Ramachandra Medical College and Research Institute, Chennai
Stanley Medical College, Royapuram, Chennai
Thanjavur Medical College, Thanjavur
Thoothukudi Medical College, Thoothukudi
Tirunelveli Medical College, Tirunelveli
SRM Medical College Hospital and Research Centre, Chennai
PSG Institute of Medical Sciences and Research, Coimbatore
Velammal Medical College Hospital and Research Institute, Madurai

Telangana

Tripura

Uttarakhand

Uttar Pradesh

West Bengal

See also
List of deemed universities
List of hospitals in India

References

External links
 National Medical Commission - College and Course search tool